St Michael and All Angels Cathedral is an Anglican church on  Eshowe, South Africa. The current incumbent is Isaiah Manqele, the Archdeacon of Eshowe.

References 

Anglican cathedrals in South Africa